Crucifixion is an oil painting on panel of  by Bramantino in the Pinacoteca di Brera, Milan. It was first recorded in that gallery's collections in 1806, without any earlier provenance.

The work's original location and commissioner are unknown; the former may have been Milan Cathedral or the church of Santa Maria in Brera. The panel might have been kept in storage due to its unorthodox iconography. Some theorise that it was produced in the milieu of religious reform movements current in Milan during its occupation by the French (later opposed by Carlo Borromeo and the Counter-Reformation), or that it was directly commissioned by Marshal Gian Giacomo Trivulzio, the city's governor on behalf of the French, who had also commissioned the cartoons for the Trivulzio tapestries from Bramantino.

References

1512 paintings
Paintings by Bramantino
Paintings in the collection of the Pinacoteca di Brera
Paintings depicting Mary Magdalene
Paintings depicting John the Apostle
Paintings of the Virgin Mary
Bramantino
Skulls in art